Calais is a genus of click beetle belonging to the family Elateridae and the subfamily Agrypninae.

Species
 Calais afghanicus Chassain, 1991 
 Calais albidus Fleutiaux 
 Calais allardi Girard, 2007 
 Calais amieti Girard, 1967 
 Calais angustus (Schwarz, 1899) 
 Calais antinorii (Candèze, 1889) 
 Calais atropos Gerstaeker 
 Calais bicarinatus (Quedenfeldt, 1886) 
 Calais biocellatus (Fleutiaux, 1919) 
 Calais brandti Platia & Gudenzi, 1999 
 Calais camerounensis Girard, 1992 
 Calais candezei (Murray, 1868) 
 Calais carayoni Girard, 1967 
 Calais catei Girard, 2008 
 Calais centrafricanus Girard, 2004 
 Calais cerberus (Candeze, 1874) 
 Calais chalcolepidinus (Fairmaire, 1892) 
 Calais congoensis Girard, 1968 
 Calais crokisii (Candeze, 1882) 
 Calais crucifer (Candèze, 1889) 
 Calais dohrni (Candeze, 1882) 
 Calais excavatus (Fabricius, 1801) 
 Calais famulus (Candèze, 1897) 
 Calais gabonensis Girard, 1992 
 Calais gerstaeckeri Fleutiaux 
 Calais hacquardi Candeze 
 Calais hayekae Girard, 1968 
 Calais hieroglyphicus Candèze, 1857 
 Calais intermedius Duvivier 
 Calais interruptus Hope 
 Calais jarrigei Girard, 1968 
 Calais josensi Girard, 1971 
 Calais lalannei Girard, 1968 
 Calais lecordieri Girard, 1968 
 Calais levasseuri Girard, 1968 
 Calais longipennis Schwarz 
 Calais macari (Candèze, 1889) 
 Calais mahenus (Fairmaire, 1892) 
 Calais marmoratus (Candeze) 
 Calais mniszechi (Candeze) 
 Calais nigromaculatus (Schwarz, 1905) 
 Calais nigrsignatus (Quedenfeldt) 
 Calais orientalis Girard, 1968 
 Calais parallelus (Candèze, 1896) 
 Calais parreysii (Steven, 1829) 
 Calais pectinatus (Fairmaire, 1897) 
 Calais pectinicornis (Schwarz, 1908) 
 Calais persicus Chassain, 1991 
 Calais polyzonus (Gerstaeker) 
 Calais proximus Girard, 2007 
 Calais pulvereus (Candèze, 1897) 
 Calais revoili (Fairmaire, 1887) 
 Calais rochebrunei (Fairmaire, 1891) 
 Calais rotundimaculatus (Schwarz, 1905) 
 Calais rudis (Candeze) 
 Calais ruteri Girard, 1968 
 Calais schneideri (Schwarz, 1908) 
 Calais scotti (Fleutiaux, 1922) 
 Calais senegalensis Laporte, 1838 
 Calais similis Girard, 1992 
 Calais sinuosicollis (Laporte) 
 Calais sjostedti (Schwarz, 1903) 
 Calais speciosus (Linnaeus, 1767)
 Calais stellio (Candèze, 1889) 
 Calais subrecticollis (Fleutiaux) 
 Calais sulcicollis (Gahan, 1900) 
 Calais tigrinus (Schwarz, 1905) 
 Calais tortrix (Candèze) - Harlequin click beetle 
 Calais trifasciatus (Gahan, 1909) 
 Calais tristis (Candèze, 1889) 
 Calais venustus Girard, 1992 
 Calais wittmeri Chassain, 1983

References

 Biolib

Elateridae genera